CA5 may refer to:
 California's 5th congressional district
 USS Huntington (CA-5), a United States Navy Pennsylvania-class armored cruiser
 United States Court of Appeals for the Fifth Circuit

CA 5 may refer to:
 California State Route 5 (disambiguation)

Ca.5 may refer to :
 Caproni Ca.5, an Italian heavy bomber of the World War I and post-war era

Ca5 may refer to:
 Ca5 line, a regional Catalonia railway line

CA-5 may refer to:
 CA-5, a highway in Honduras